The Bermuda hawk (Bermuteo avivorus) was the sole member of the genus Bermuteo.

Distribution
The Bermuda hawk inhabited the island of Bermuda where it is recorded in the fossil record and is thought to account for a report of sightings of raptors made on the island in 1603 by Diego Ramírez, which mentions "very handsome sparrow-hawks, so stupid that we even clubbed them".

Extinction
The species apparently was not present in 1623, when Captain John Smith noted that there were only migrant raptors on Bermuda. Its date of extinction is not known but is presumed to have followed the human settlement on the island in the 17th century and may have been due to hunting and the introduction of invasive species.

References

Bird extinctions since 1500
Extinct birds of Atlantic islands
Birds of Bermuda
Birds described in 2008
Fossil taxa described in 2008
Late Quaternary prehistoric birds